Kerry A. Benninghoff is an American politician and coroner serving as a member of the Pennsylvania House of Representatives from the 171st district. Elected in November 1996, he assumed office on January 7, 1997.

Early life and education 
Benninghoff was born in Lebanon, Pennsylvania. He graduated from State College Area High School and attended Pennsylvania State University from 1980 to 1981. He is also a graduate of the Certified Coroners Training Program of the Pennsylvania State Police Academy.

Career
While working as an orderly at Mount Nittany Medical Center in State College, Pennsylvania, Benninghoff was appointed as deputy coroner of Centre County, Pennsylvania in 1985. In 1991, when Coroner Robert Neff retired, Benninghoff was elected to the office. He was re-elected in 1995.

In 1996, when Representative Ruth Rudy retired, Benninghoff declared his candidacy to succeed her. He defeated Democrat Keith Bierly in the general election that year and has been re-elected to each succeeding session of the House.

In 2018, after being re-elected to the House, Benninghoff was elected by members of the Republican Caucus to serve as House majority whip.

On June 22, 2020, Bennighoff was elected House majority leader. As majority leader, Benninghoff is the second highest-ranking Republican in the chamber behind Speaker Bryan Cutler.

Benninghoff is against legalizing adult-use cannabis in Pennsylvania. He has described it as a gateway drug and cites the opioid epidemic as a concern.

Personal life
Benninghoff lives in Bellefonte, Pennsylvania. He has five children.

References

External links
Representative Kerry Benninghoff's official web site

|-

21st-century American politicians
American coroners
Living people
People from Centre County, Pennsylvania
Republican Party members of the Pennsylvania House of Representatives
Year of birth missing (living people)